Butaya is a genus of moths in the family Cossidae occurring in China and Vietnam.

Species
 Butaya auko Yakovlev, 2014
 Butaya gracilis Yakovlev, 2004

References

 , 2004: New taxa of Cossidae from SE Asia. Atalanta 35(3-4): 369-382.
 , 2006, New Cossidae (Lepidoptera) from Asia, Africa and Macronesia, Tinea 19 (3): 188-213.

External links
Natural History Museum Lepidoptera generic names catalog

Zeuzerinae
Cossidae genera